The local assembly of bishops is the Episcopal Conference of Burkina Faso and of Niger (French: Episcopal Conférence du Burkina-Niger, CEBN). Its purposes are to coordinate and make dynamic pastoral activities of the Catholic Church in the nations of Burkina Faso and Niger for the good of the faithful (Article 1 of the Statutes), and encourage the sharing of resources and people for a common assumption evangelizing mission of the church in the two countries (Article 2).

To carry out these tasks, the Conference has adopted the following bodies: the Plenary Assembly, the Permanent Council of the Episcopal Council for Economic Affairs, the secretary general, and several smaller bodies such as commissions, secretariats and technical committees.

The CEBN is a member of the Regional Episcopal Conference of Francophone West Africa and Symposium of Episcopal Conferences of Africa and Madagascar (SECAM).

Presidents of the Bishops' Conference 

1970-1976: Paul Zoungrana, Cardinal, Archbishop of Ouagadougou

1976-1982: Dieudonné Yougbaré, Archbishop of Koupéla

1982-1988: Anselme Titianma Sanon, Archbishop of Bobo-Dioulasso

1988-1995: Jean-Marie Untaani Compaoré, Bishop of Fada N'gourma

1995-2001: Jean-Baptiste Somé, Bishop of Diebougou

2001-2007: Philippe Ouedraogo, Bishop of Ouahigouya

From 2007: Séraphin François Rouamba, Archbishop of Koupéla

See also
Catholic Church in Burkina Faso
Catholic Church in Niger

References

External links
 http://www.egliseduburkina.org/
 http://www.gcatholic.org/dioceses/country/BF.htm
 http://www.catholic-hierarchy.org/country/bf.html 

Burkina Faso
Catholic Church in Burkina Faso
Catholic Church in Niger

it:Chiesa cattolica in Burkina Faso#Conferenza episcopale